Guemar is a Saharan oasis town in Algeria near the Tunisian border, in the Oued Souf area of the El Oued Province, about 20 km north of El Oued.  It includes a zaouia and a border post. According to the 2008 census it has a population of 39,168, up from 29,185 in 1998, with an annual growth rate of 3.0%.

Climate

Guemar has a hot desert climate (Köppen climate classification BWh), with very hot summers and mild winters. Rainfall is light and sporadic, and summers are particularly dry.

Transportation
Guemar lies on the N48 highway from El Oued to Still and then Biskra via the N3. The town is served by Guemar Airport.

Education

8.5% of the population has a tertiary education (the highest in the province), and another 15.5% has completed secondary education. The overall literacy rate is 78.5%, and is 85.5% among males and 71.4% among females.

Localities 
The commune of Guemar is composed of 13 localities:

Guemar
Gharbia
Erg Souari Ghamra
El Houd
Ghamra Sud
Ghamra Centre
Ghamra Nord
Gour Debaa
Miha Khalifa
Demitha
Miha Salah
Djedeïda
Mih Atla

References

Neighbouring towns and cities

Communes of El Oued Province
El Oued Province